MKA may refer to
 Magnusson Klemencic Associates
 Majlis Khuddam-ul Ahmadiyya: Khuddam-ul Ahmadiyya
 Malaysian Kennel Association or Persatuan Kenel Anjing Malaysia
 Mandakini Ki Awaaz, an Indian community radio
 Mary-Kate and Ashley Olsen
 Matroska Audio - the Matroska Multimedia Container is an open standard free container format, which can contain video, audio, picture or subtitle tracks
 Matthew Knight Arena
 Montclair Kimberley Academy
 Mario Kart Advance, the Japanese title for Mario Kart: Super Circuit
 Mortal Kombat: Annihilation
 Mortal Kombat: Armageddon
 Mustafa Kemal Atatürk
 Makani Kai Air, a small Hawaiian airline
 Milwaukee Airport Railroad Station, Wisconsin, United States; Amtrak station code MKA.